Rocky Run is a tributary of Bull Creek in Butler County in the U.S. state of Pennsylvania.

Course 

The entire course of Rocky Run is within Clinton Township. It rises just east of Sandy Hill Road along Glade Mill Road (part of PA Route 228). The stream generally flows in a southeastern direction towards Allegheny County. Rocky Run then empties into Bull Creek near Saxonburg Boulevard's intersection with Cherry Valley Road.

See also 

 List of rivers of Pennsylvania
 List of tributaries of the Allegheny River

References

External links

U.S. Geological Survey: PA stream gaging stations

Rivers of Pennsylvania
Tributaries of the Allegheny River
Rivers of Butler County, Pennsylvania